David Park is the name of:
 David Park (art historian) (born 1952), professor at the Courtauld Institute, London
 David Park (computer scientist) (1935–1990), British computer scientist
 David Park (golfer) (born 1974), Welsh golfer
 David Park (music producer) (born 1983), Korean-American record producer
 David Park (painter) (1911–1960), American painter

See also

David Parks (disambiguation)
David Parkes (disambiguation)